Duncan Preston (born 11 August 1946) is an English actor. He is known for his appearances in television productions written by Victoria Wood, including his role in the soap opera parody sketches Acorn Antiques and as Stan in the sitcom dinnerladies (1998–2000). He reprised his role of Clifford in Acorn Antiques: The Musical! in 2005. His other television roles include DS Todd in the soap opera EastEnders (1987), Jonathan Haslam in the sitcom Surgical Spirit (1989–1995); and Doug Potts in the soap opera Emmerdale (2007–2011, 2014–2020).

Career
Preston appeared in a short 1981 Public information film entitled Say NO to Strangers, as a kerb-crawling predator attempting to lure a schoolgirl into his car. He has also made many guest appearances in various TV series, including Hunters Walk, Secret Army, The Professionals, All Creatures Great and Small, Robin of Sherwood, Bergerac, The New Statesman, Press Gang, Chalk, Boon, Casualty, Heartbeat, The Royal, Hetty Wainthropp Investigates, Holby City, Peak Practice, Midsomer Murders, Dalziel and Pascoe and My Family. His film career includes roles in Porridge (1979), A Nightingale Sang in Berkeley Square (1979), Scandalous (1984), Milk (1999), Nativity 3: Dude, Where's My Donkey? (2014) and in the horror film Howl (2015).

He was also a regular cast member in the sitcom Surgical Spirit and appeared as Dennis Stokes in Coronation Street in 2004. Preston played Doug Potts, the father of Laurel Thomas in Emmerdale. He has also appeared on Lily Savage's Blankety Blank.

From 2002 to 2012, Preston co-starred as Det. Sgt. Riley in the BBC Radio crime drama Trueman and Riley, opposite Robert Daws.

In 2022, Preston appeared in series 25 of Silent Witness.

Personal life
Preston was married to actress Susan Penhaligon between 1986 and 1992. They subsequently reconciled in 1997, though they have not remarried. Duncan has supported the Bradford Bulls Rugby League team throughout his life, having first attended a game when he was 3 years old.

Stage work
A renowned Shakespearean actor, Preston has performed in many productions for the Royal Shakespeare Company, including playing Angus in Trevor Nunn's version of Macbeth (stage 1976, television 1978), starring Ian McKellen and Judi Dench. Other theatre work includes a 2007 production of To Kill A Mockingbird.

He was awarded an honorary Doctor of Letters degree by the University of Bradford on 4 December 2002 "for his contributions as an actor".

References

1946 births
English male soap opera actors
English male stage actors
Living people
Male actors from Bradford
People educated at Bradford Grammar School
Alumni of RADA